A test pilot is an aircraft pilot with additional training to fly and evaluate experimental, newly produced and modified aircraft with specific maneuvers, known as flight test techniques.

History
Test flying as a systematic activity started during the First World War, at the Royal Aircraft Establishment (RAE) in the United Kingdom. 
An "Experimental Flight" was formed at the Central Flying School.
During the 1920s, test flying was further developed by the RAE in the UK, and by the National Advisory Committee for Aeronautics (NACA) in the United States. In the 1950s, NACA was transformed into the National Aeronautics and Space Administration, or NASA. During these years, as work was done into aircraft stability and handling qualities, test flying evolved towards a more qualitative scientific profession. In the 1950s, test pilots were being killed at the rate of about one a week, but the risks have shrunk to a fraction of that because of the maturation of aircraft technology, better ground-testing and simulation of aircraft performance, fly-by-wire technology and, lately, the use of unmanned aerial vehicles to test experimental aircraft features. Still, piloting experimental aircraft remains more dangerous than most other types of flying.

At the insistence of President Dwight D. Eisenhower, the first American astronauts, the Mercury Seven, were all military test pilots, as were some of the later astronauts.

The world's oldest test pilot  school is what is now called the Empire Test Pilots' School (motto "Learn to Test – Test to Learn"), at RAF Boscombe Down in the UK. There are a number of similar establishments over the world. In America, the United States Air Force Test Pilot School is located at Edwards Air Force Base, the United States Naval Test Pilot School is located at Naval Air Station Patuxent River, Maryland and EPNER (Ecole du Personnel Navigant d'Essai et de Reception – "School for flight test and acceptance personnel"), the French test pilot school, is located in Istres, France. There are only two civilian schools; the International Test Pilots School in London, Ontario, and the National Test Pilot School, a not-for-profit educational institute is in Mojave, California. In Russia, there is a Russian aviation industry Fedotov Test Pilot School (founded 1947) located in Zhukovsky within the Gromov Flight Research Institute.

Qualifications
Understand a test plan
Stick to a test plan by flying a plane in a highly specific way
Carefully document the results of each test
Have an excellent feel for the aircraft and sense exactly how it is behaving oddly if it is doing so
Solve problems quickly if anything goes wrong with the aircraft during a test
Cope with many different things going wrong at once
Effectively communicate flight test observations to engineers and relate engineering results to the pilot community, thus bridging the gap between those who design and build aircraft with those who employ the aircraft to accomplish a mission
Have an excellent knowledge of aeronautical engineering to understand how and why planes are tested.
Be above-average pilots with excellent analytical skills and the ability to fly accurately while they follow a flight plan.

Test pilots can be experimental and engineering test pilots (investigating the characteristics of new types of aircraft during development) or production test pilots (the more mundane role of confirming the characteristics of new aircraft as they come off the production line). Many test pilots would perform both roles during their careers.  Modern test pilots often receive formal training from highly-selective military test pilot schools, but other test pilots receive training and experience from civilian institutions and/or manufacturers' test pilot development programs.

Notable test pilots

Eric "Winkle" Brown, flew more types of aircraft than any other pilot
Chuck Yeager, first pilot to break the sound barrier
Tony LeVier, chief engineering test pilot at Lockheed Corporation
Scott Crossfield, chief engineering test pilot at North American Engineering
David P. Davies, chief test pilot for the United Kingdom Civil Aviation Authority

See also
 List of aerospace flight test centres
 The Right Stuff by Tom Wolfe

References

Notes

Bibliography

 Hallion, Richard P.Test Pilots: Frontiersmen of Flight. Washington, DC: Smithsonian Press, 1988. 
 Warsitz, Lutz: THE FIRST JET PILOT – The Story of German Test Pilot Erich Warsitz, Pen and Sword Books Ltd., England, 2009,

External links
The Society of Experimental Test Pilots
Society of Flight Test Engineers
Wilson, George C. Flying the edge : the making of Navy test pilots. Naval Institute Press, 1992. - 
Memorial website for test pilots who died in flying accidents in the UK
Flight list of display and test pilots at 1957 Farnborough air show
The Scott Crossfield Foundation
website on Erich Warsitz (world’s first jet pilot)

Occupations in aviation